Sul e Sudoeste de Minas is one of the twelve mesoregions of the Brazilian state of Minas Gerais. It is composed of 146 municipalities distributed across 10 microregions.

References 

Sul e Sudoeste de Minas